The 2022 Namibia Tri-Nation Series was the 17th round of the 2019–2023 ICC Cricket World Cup League 2 cricket tournament, took place in Namibia in November 2022. It was a tri-nation series between Namibia, Papua New Guinea and the United States cricket teams, with the matches played as One Day International (ODI) fixtures. The ICC Cricket World Cup League 2 formed part of the qualification pathway to the 2023 Cricket World Cup.

Originally the series was scheduled to take place in September 2020. However, the series was postponed in July 2020 due to the COVID-19 pandemic. In December 2020, the International Cricket Council (ICC) announced the rescheduled dates for the series.

Namibia and the United States each claimed three wins from four games, while Papua New Guinea continued their struggles in the Cricket World Cup League 2 by losing all four of their matches in Windhoek. In the fourth match of the series, Namibia's Tangeni Lungameni took six wickets for thirty-two runs in a victory against Papua New Guinea, setting the best ODI bowling figures for his country in an ODI.

Squads

Fixtures

1st ODI

2nd ODI

3rd ODI

4th ODI

5th ODI

6th ODI

References

External links
 Series home at ESPNcricinfo

2022 in American cricket
2022 in Namibian cricket
2022 in Papua New Guinean cricket
International cricket competitions in 2022–23
Namibia
Namibia Tri-Nation Series
Namibia Tri-Nation Series